The 17th Ryder Cup Matches were held October 20–22, 1967 at the Champions Golf Club in Houston, Texas.
The United States team won the competition by a record score of 23 to 8 points. To date, the 15-point victory margin remains the largest at the Ryder Cup.

Ben Hogan was named the captain of the U.S. team in May 1967, five months before the matches.

The match had originally been arranged for June 9–11, a date that the British P.G.A. had reluctantly agreed to, as it interfered with the British tournament season. In April 1966, it was agreed that the dates be changed to October 20–22.

The course hosted the U.S. Open two years later in 1969.

Format
The Ryder Cup is a match play event, with each match worth one point.  From 1963 through 1971 the competition format was as follows:
Day 1 — 8 foursomes (alternate shot) matches, 4 each in morning and afternoon sessions
Day 2 — 8 four-ball (better ball) matches, 4 each in morning and afternoon sessions
Day 3 — 16 singles matches, 8 each in morning and afternoon sessions
With a total of 32 points, 16 points were required to win the Cup.  All matches were played to a maximum of 18 holes.

Teams
Source: 

The British team was based on a points system using performances in 1966 and 1967, finishing after the 1967 Open Championship.

Friday matches
October 20, 1967

Morning foursomes

Afternoon foursomes

Saturday matches
October 21, 1967

Morning four-ball

Afternoon four-ball

Sunday matches
October 22, 1967

Morning singles

Afternoon singles

Individual player records
Each entry refers to the win–loss–half record of the player.

Source:

United States

Great Britain

Nicklaus absence
Despite having won his seventh major title as a professional at the U.S. Open in June, 27-year-old Jack Nicklaus was not a member of the U.S. team.  At the time, a five-year apprenticeship as a professional was required before Ryder Cup points could be earned. Nicklaus turned pro in November 1961 and was granted tournament status at the end of that year. He expedited his status by passing PGA business classes in February 1966, and was granted full membership that June.  Only then was he eligible to accumulate Ryder Cup points, which ended with the Masters in April. Captain's selections did not exist in 1967 and Nicklaus was in a slump following his win at the Masters in 1966; entering the Masters in 1967 as the two-time defending champion, he was in 13th place in the U.S. Ryder Cup standings. Also just off the team were Dave Marr and Bob Goalby. Nicklaus and Goalby missed the cut at Augusta and Marr's T-16 finish was not enough to pass Johnny Pott for the tenth and final spot on the team. Pott was 4–0–0 in the competition.

The outmoded five-year rule had similarly kept Arnold Palmer off  the teams in 1957 and 1959. Don January won the PGA Championship in 1967 in July, but was also at home; the only reigning major champion on either team in 1967 was Masters champion Gay Brewer.

Nicklaus competed in the Ryder Cup as a player from 1969 through 1981, missing only in 1979. He was the non-playing captain in 1983 and 1987.

References

External links
PGA of America: 1967 Ryder Cup 
About.com: 1967 Ryder Cup
Champions Golf Club – official site

Ryder Cup
Golf in Houston
Sports competitions in Houston
Ryder Cup
Ryder Cup
Ryder Cup
Ryder Cup
1960s in Houston